Masahito Arai (新井正人, Arai Masahito; born March 25, 1958) is a Japanese singer, composer and a member of JASRAC. He debuted with the group Pal in 1979, but split from the group due to creative differences. He had solo debut in 1987 with the group Sentimental City Romance. After, he became the lead vocalist of Brand New Omega Tribe from 1993 to 1994 after being scouted by producer Koichi Fujita. BNOT released two singles and one album before splitting. He is currently working as a composer and has appeared for live events of anime songs from Gundam-related music events and Super Robot Spirits Live.

Discography

Singles

Studio albums

Compositions 
Mio Aso – "Ai ga Isoi Deru"
Mio Aso – "Kisu o Nuide"
Elika – "Thank You For Your Heart"
Kaoru Sudō – "Noise Gay"
Kaoru Sudō – "Haru no Hizashi"
Kaoru Sudō – "Futari no Shiruetto"
Takanori Hiura – "With You"
Kiyoshi Maekawa – "Eien"
MIQ – Teraamāta 〜 Aisuru Daichi 〜"
Kunihiko Mitamura – "Tōkyō Hōmushikkugāru"
Yuki Yamagata – "Galaxy Divine Wind"

References

External links 
Official website

1958 births
Japanese composers
Japanese male composers
Japanese male singers
Living people
Omega Tribe (Japanese band) members